Pippo Schembri (born 17 February 1911, date of death unknown) was a Maltese water polo player. He competed in the men's tournament at the 1936 Summer Olympics.

References

External links
 

1911 births
Year of death missing
Maltese male water polo players
Olympic water polo players of Malta
Water polo players at the 1936 Summer Olympics
Place of birth missing